Best of Shooting Star (aka Touch Me Tonight) is a compilation by American Rock band Shooting Star. The album predominantly consists of songs taken from the band's first four studio albums, all of which charted on the 'Billboard Top Album' chart at the time of their release; along with two songs ("Christmas Together" and "Touch Me Tonight") which had never before featured on a Shooting Star album prior to the release of Best of Shooting Star.

Track listing

Tracks 1-4 are taken from Shooting Star (1980).
Tracks 5-8 are taken from Hang On for Your Life (1981).
Track 9 is taken from III Wishes (1982).
Tracks 10 and 11 are taken from Burning (1983).
Track 12 was previously a single-only release in 1985.
Track 13 was previously unreleased.

Personnel
Shooting Star
Van McLain – lead vocals, guitars (all tracks)
Steve Thomas – drums, percussion (all tracks)
Gary West – lead vocals, piano, keyboards, timpani drums (tracks 1–12)
Charles Waltz – backing vocals, violin, keyboards (tracks 1–12)
Ron Verlin – bass guitar (tracks 1–11 and 13)
Bill Guffey – keyboards (tracks 1–8)
Norm Dahlor – bass guitar (track 12)
Keith Mitchell – lead vocals (track 13)
Dennis Laffoon – keyboards (track 13)

Additional personnel
Unidos – backing vocals (track 12)
Baby Lee – backing vocals (track 13)

References

1989 greatest hits albums
Albums produced by Gus Dudgeon
Shooting Star (band) albums